Lynnewood Hall is a 110-room Neoclassical Revival mansion in Elkins Park, Montgomery County, Pennsylvania. Currently undergoing renovations after sitting nearly vacant for years, it was designed by architect Horace Trumbauer for industrialist Peter A. B. Widener and built between 1897 and 1900. Considered the largest surviving Gilded Age mansion in the Philadelphia area, it housed one of the most important Gilded Age private art collections of European masterpieces and decorative arts, which had been assembled by Widener and his younger son, Joseph E. Widener.

Peter Widener died at Lynnewood Hall at the age of 80 on November 6, 1915, after prolonged poor health. He was predeceased by his elder son George Dunton Widener and grandson Harry Elkins Widener, both of whom died when RMS Titanic sank in 1912. The structure changed hands a few times over the subsequent decades, with large portions of the estate grounds sold off in the 1940s, and has been predominantly vacant since 1952, when it was purchased by a theological seminary that started selling off the interior detailing.

Description
In addition to 55 bedrooms, the 110-room mansion had a large art gallery, a ballroom large enough for 1,000 guests, swimming pool, wine cellars, a farm, carpentry and upholstery studios, and an electrical power plant.

A 2014 Philadelphia Inquirer article described the mansion as "dripping with silk, velvet, and gilded moldings, the rooms furnished with chairs from Louis XV's palace, Persian rugs, and Chinese pottery, the halls crammed with art by Raphael, Rembrandt, El Greco, van Dyck, Donatello." TIME magazine published an account of a lavish party held at Lynnewood Hall in 1932.

Art collection

From 1915 to 1940, the spectacular art collection at Lynnewood Hall was open to the public by appointment between June and October. In 1940, Joseph E. Widener donated more than 2,000 sculptures, paintings, decorative art works, and porcelains to the National Gallery of Art. P.A.B. Widener had originally planned for the collection to go to the Philadelphia Museum of Art. The paintings included Raphael's Small Cowper Madonna, Bellini's The Feast of the Gods, eight van Dycks, two Vermeers, fourteen Rembrandts, and a series of portraits by Gainsborough and Reynolds. The sculptures included Donatello's David and Desiderio da Settignano's St John the Baptist.

Lynnewood Hall after Widener ownership

The grounds were used for training military dogs during World War II, and parcels of the land outside the property fence (see below) were sold to others after 1943.

Lynnewood Hall was purchased in 1952 by Faith Theological Seminary a Christian school of higher education headed by Carl McIntire. The Seminary trained hundreds of ministers and Christian leaders at Lynnewood Hall for over 40 years. Near the end of that time, some of the interior detailing, such as mantels, walnut paneling, and landscape ornamentation was sold off in order to raise funds. This is evidenced by the 2006 auction of a French bronze figural fountain—one of only two major surviving Henri-Leon Greber commissions in America—originally installed at Lynnewood Hall.

Lynnewood Hall was added to the Preservation Alliance for Greater Philadelphia's 2003 list for most endangered historic properties and is eligible for the National Register of Historic Places.  It is cited in Cheltenham Township's Comprehensive Plan as one of the township's cultural and historical resources, and in the township's Open Space Plan as a priority for preservation, warranting a conservation easement.  The seminary and property was eventually foreclosed upon by the second-mortgagee, reportedly a one-time follower of McIntire.

At  according to Montgomery County Board of Assessment data, Lynnewood Hall is owned by the First Korean Church of New York which acquired the property in 1996. However, Lynnewood is not in use by that church and remains uninhabited. As of 2007, no significant stabilization or repair efforts have been evident. On June 25, 2007, the Cheltenham Township Planning Commission reviewed and denied a submitted request (Appeal No. 3225) by the First Korean Church of New York, Inc., owner of premises known as 920 Spring Avenue, Elkins Park, Pennsylvania from the Decision of the Zoning Officer for a variance from the rules and regulations of the Class R-2 Residence District as outlined in CCS 295–14. for the use of the premises as a Church and a Domicile for a Caretaker/Assistant Pastor instead of one of the permitted enumerated uses. This was the second such request, the first submitted in 1998, for a variance. That resulted in a lawsuit [see First Korean Church of New York v. Twp. of Cheltenham Zoning Bd; submitted to the Pennsylvania Supreme Court May 2001], which upheld Cheltenham's denial of the request. In 2017 the property was rezoned for adaptive-reuse mixed-use development.

There have been negotiations ongoing of new ownership and possible renovations to the estate.  Parties had hoped to have a plan finalized by the end of 2011.  The proposed renovation could take the estate back to a private residence, and offer guest rooms to social elite and that of a high society bed and breakfast.  Ongoing searches for previous pieces of the estate that belonged to Lynnewood Hall have been undertaken, and the total cost of renovations will be determined by the buyer.  
In a state court decision handed down in February 2012 by Judge Norma L. Shapiro, the court ruled the First Korean Church of New York, Inc. did not qualify for tax exemption.  In a rare interview with the Philadelphia Inquirer after this court ruling with Dr. Richard S. Yoon, video cameras were permitted inside Lynnewood Hall and the original seminary chapel.  Dr. Yoon stated, “We have no choice (but) to relocate.  We don’t want to fight any more.”

The mansion's grounds, bordered by Ashbourne Road, Spring Avenue and Cedar Lane, are surrounded by their original wrought-iron fencing and gates with stone base and pillars, in marked contrast to that of nearby Trumbauer contemporary Whitemarsh Hall whose similar fencing (which encompassed a much greater acreage) was sacrificed for wartime scrap and rapid postwar development. A gatehouse and another staff outbuilding, of the same materials as Lynnewood, also still exist within the fence. The property within the fence has remained contiguous, never having been subdivided.

This property was on the market for $11,000,000 in May 2019. Despite multiple offers above the asking price, the home remains unsold. A historical restoration architect estimated in 2014 that it would take about $50 million to restore the mansion to its former glory; however, Realtor Frank Johnson suggests the property could be renovated for $3 million to $8 million.

On July 5, 2022, it was announced that an organization, the Lynnewood Hall Preservation Foundation was established with the goal of acquiring "the Trumbauer-designed Widener Family Estate, a true architectural masterpiece, and see it restored to its former breathtaking glory."

On February 8, 2023, a purchase agreement was announced for the property by the foundation, with plans for the restored gardens to be open to the public as a park, and to fully restore the hall.

References

External links

 Site dedicated to Lynnewood Hall and its preservation.
 Historical Information
 Historical aerial photos of the estate in the 1920s and 1930s
 Aerial video of Lynnewood Hall

Houses in Montgomery County, Pennsylvania
Widener family
Neoclassical architecture in Pennsylvania
Houses completed in 1900
Elkins Park, Pennsylvania
Horace Trumbauer buildings
Gilded Age mansions